A totem pole is an Indigenous, Native American artifact.

Totem pole may refer to:

 Ed Galloway's Totem Pole Park, in Rogers County, Oklahoma
 Totem pole output, also known as a push-pull output, a type of electronic circuit
 The Totem Pole (Tasmania), a rock spire/sea stack in Tasmania, Australia
 Melaleuca decussata, a plant species with the common name Totem Poles
 Totem Pole (Monument Valley), one of the geological features in Monument Valley

See also
 Pole (disambiguation)
 Totem (disambiguation)